Adelaide of Vermandois (died 23 Sep 1120) was suo jure Countess of Vermandois and Valois from 1080 to 1120.

Adelaide was the daughter of Herbert IV, Count of Vermandois and Adele of Valois.

By 1080, Adelaide married Hugh, son of the Capetian King Henry I of France and younger brother of Philip I of France. Hugh became Count of Vermandois, following Adelaide’s father's death.

In 1104, Adelaide married Renaud II, Count of Clermont-en-Beauvaisis. By this marriage, Adelaide had a daughter, Margaret of Clermont.

In 1102, Adelaide was succeeded by her son, Ralph I. Adelaide died in 1120, being the last Carolingian to hold the County of Vermandois.

Issue
Adelaide and Hugh had:
 Matilda, married Ralph I of Beaugency
 Beatrice, married Hugh IV of Gournay
 Elizabeth of Vermandois, Countess of Leicester (died 1131)
 Ralph I, Count of Vermandois 
 Constance, married Godfrey de la Ferté-Gaucher
 Agnes, married Boniface of Savone
 Henry (died 1130), Lord of Chaumont en Vexin
 Simon (died 1148)
 William, possibly married to Isabella, daughter of Louis VI of France.
Adelaide and Renaud had:

 Margaret of Clermont

Notes

References

Sources

Counts of Vermandois
Counts of Valois
Herbertien dynasty
Vermandois, Countess of, Adelaide
Medieval French nobility
11th-century French people
12th-century French people
1120 deaths
11th-century women rulers
12th-century women rulers
11th-century French women
12th-century French women